German submarine U-760 was a Type VIIC U-boat of Nazi Germany's Kriegsmarine during World War II.

Her keel was laid down 5 August 1940 by the Kriegsmarinewerft of Wilhelmshaven, and she was commissioned  15 October 1942 with Oberleutnant zur See Otto-Ulrich Blum in command. Blum commanded her for her entire career in the Kriegsmarine.

Design
German Type VIIC submarines were preceded by the shorter Type VIIB submarines. U-760 had a displacement of  when at the surface and  while submerged. She had two shafts and two  propellers.

U-760 was fitted with five  torpedo tubes (four fitted at the bow and one at the stern), fourteen torpedoes, one  SK C/35 naval gun, 220 rounds, and two twin  C/30 anti-aircraft guns. The boat had a complement of between forty-four and sixty.

Service history
U-760 conducted two war patrols, but never sank or damaged a ship. On 26 February 1943 Obermaschinist Jakob Ippendorf died during an air attack in Wilhelmshaven. On 12 August 1943 Matrosenenobergefreiter Günter Werner was lost during an air attack in the North Atlantic.

Fate
International neutrality agreements allowed ships to spend up to 24 hours in neutral harbours to make emergency repairs, but U-760 was unable to get underway in time. She was interned at Ferrol for the remainder of World War II. The submarine engine was dismantled and used to generate electric energy for the city of Vigo's tram network. On 23 July 1945, the boat was taken to the United Kingdom for Operation Deadlight and was scuttled on 13 December 1945.

One other U-boat was interned in Spain during World War II: .

References

Bibliography

External links

German Type VIIC submarines
U-boats commissioned in 1942
Operation Deadlight
World War II submarines of Germany
Ships built in Wilhelmshaven
1942 ships
Maritime incidents in September 1943
Maritime incidents in December 1945
U-boats scuttled in 1945